The Great Seal of Ireland was the seal used before 1922 by the Dublin Castle administration in Ireland to authenticate important state documents.

Great Seal of Ireland may also refer to:
the Great Seal of Ireland introduced by Oliver Cromwell in 1655,  see Great Seal of the Realm
the Seal of the President of Ireland introduced in 1937

See also
Great Seal of Northern Ireland
Great Seal of the Irish Free State